The Taurus Express is a passenger train operating daily between Konya and Adana. In the past it was a premier overnight passenger train operated by Compagnie Internationale des Wagons-Lits between İstanbul and Baghdad. After 1972, passengers could travel down to Basra via connection to the Express 2 made at Baghdad Central Station. However, service was suspended in 2003, due to the outbreak of war in Iraq. In 2012, the State Railways renewed service between Eskişehir and Adana and will once again service İstanbul when track work in the city is complete. There is a chance that the train may continue to its former terminus in Baghdad in the future, but the possibility remains low for the time being.

History

thumb|Poster for railways CIWL Orient-Express and Taurus Express.

The Taurus Express ran for the first time on 15 February 1930. However, at that time, passengers had to transfer to a motor coach provided by the Compagnie Internationale des Wagons-Lits for the stage of the journey between Nusaybin and Kirkuk. From Kirkuk, the journey was continued on the meter-gauge railway to Baghdad. In 1939, this service was running three times a week from Istanbul to Baghdad, with connections to Teheran and to Cairo.

With the completion of the Baghdad Railway, the first continuous rail journey of the Taurus Express departed from Haydarpaşa Terminal in Istanbul on July 17, 1940, and arrived at Baghdad Central Station in Baghdad on July 20, 1940.

The Taurus Express originally ran on tracks owned by the Turkish State Railways, Southern Railways, Northern Syria & Cilician Railways and the Iraqi State Railways. The Turkish State Railways acquired the Southern Railways in 1948 and the Syrian Railways acquired the Northern Syria & Cilician Railways in 1965. The train ran twice weekly but after 1972 it ran weekly.

Consist
The consist of the first Taurus Express was this:
TCDD Steam Loco 3688 
TCDD Baggage Car 
CIWL Sleeping Car
CIWL Sleeping Car
TCDD Coach
TCDD Coach
TCDD Baggage Car

After 1972 the diesel locomotives were the main power and the consists from 1972 to 2003 were like this:
IRR DEM 2000 Locomotive (Baghdad-Karkamış)
TCDD DE 24000 Locomotive (Karkamış-İstanbul)
TCDD Postage Car
TCDD Sleeping Car
TCDD Couchette Car
TCDD Coach
TCDD Baggage Car

In popular culture
The Taurus Express is featured in Agatha Christie's crime novel Murder on the Orient Express (1934). While the main body of the story takes place on another of the Compagnie Internationale des Wagons-Lits trains, the Simplon-Orient Express, the opening chapter of the book takes place on the Taurus Express.

References

External links
 illustrated description of the route and a journey from Haydarpasa station to Basra
 Toros Ekspresi

Named passenger trains of Turkey
Rail transport in Iraq
Rail transport in Syria
International named passenger trains
Iraq–Turkey relations
Night trains